Robert Christopher "Chris" Dillon (born 1965) is a North Carolina attorney and judge of the North Carolina Court of Appeals. Dillon won election to the appellate court in a statewide race on Nov. 6, 2012, when he defeated incumbent Cressie Thigpen. Dillon won re-election on Nov. 3, 2020 over challenger Gray Styers.

Early life and education 
Chris Dillon was born and raised in Raleigh, the youngest of C.A. and Mildred Dillon’s five children. He attended public schools throughout his childhood, graduating from Needham Broughton High School. Judge Dillon is a “double Tar Heel,” having earned his B.S. in Business Administration and his law degree from the University of North Carolina at Chapel Hill. In 2018, Judge Dillon graduated from Duke University with an LL.M. degree.

Career
Following law school, Judge Dillon practiced law at Young Moore Henderson in Raleigh, focusing on administrative, business, and real estate law.

Judge Dillon has been licensed by the North Carolina Real Estate Commission as a broker for over twenty years and has worked as a commercial real estate broker where he created and managed a number of investment real estate entities.

In 2006, Judge Dillon helped start a community bank where he served as a Senior Vice President. In 2011, he returned to private practice, representing a number of small business owners, professionals, and a state occupational licensing board.

In 2012, Judge Dillon was elected to an eight-year term on the North Carolina Court of Appeals.  Judge Dillon has been an adjunct professor, teaching real estate focused courses at both UNC School of Law and Campbell School of Law.  In 2018, Judge Dillon was awarded his LLM degree from the Duke University School of Law in the field of Judicial Studies.

Throughout his career, Judge Dillon has served on a number of civic boards and committees, including DHIC, Inc. (formerly Downtown Housing Improvement Corporation), the North Carolina Bar Association, and the Friends of the NC Museum of Natural Sciences.  He has taught youth Sunday School at Edenton Street United Methodist Church since 1990.

In 2020, Judge Dillon was re-elected to another eight-year term on the North Carolina Court of Appeals.  Following his re-election, he was appointed to serve as Chair of the North Carolina Judicial Standards Commission

Family 
Judge Dillon is married to Ann (née Finley), a special education teacher and also the youngest of five children.  Together, they are the parents of five children:  Sally, Matt, Anna, Molly, and Sam.

References

1965 births
Living people
Place of birth missing (living people)
North Carolina Court of Appeals judges
North Carolina Republicans
University of North Carolina School of Law alumni
UNC Kenan–Flagler Business School alumni
21st-century American judges